The 2016–17 Georgia Tech Yellow Jackets women's basketball team represented Georgia Institute of Technology during the 2016–17 NCAA Division I women's basketball season. Returning as head coach is MaChelle Joseph entering her 14th season. The team played their home games at Hank McCamish Pavilion in Atlanta, Georgia as members of the Atlantic Coast Conference. They finished the season 22–15, 5–11 in ACC play to finish in tenth place. They advanced to the second round of the ACC women's tournament where they lost to Miami (FL). They were invited to the Women's National Invitation Tournament where they advanced to the championship game where they lost to Michigan.

2016–17 media
All Yellow Jackets games will air on the Yellow Jackets IMG Sports Network. WREK once again serves as the home of the Ramblin Wreck women's basketball team.

Roster

Schedule

|-
!colspan=9 style=""| Non-conference regular season

|-
!colspan=9 style=""| ACC regular season

|-
!colspan=9 style=""| ACC Women's Tournament

|-
!colspan=9 style=""| WNIT

Source

Rankings
2016–17 NCAA Division I women's basketball rankings

See also
2016–17 Georgia Tech Yellow Jackets men's basketball team

References

Georgia Tech Yellow Jackets women's basketball seasons
Georgia Tech
2017 Women's National Invitation Tournament participants